.bcn is a generic top-level domain for the city of Barcelona, Catalonia, Spain.

According to the Barcelona City Council, the .bcn domain is intended to maintain a relationship of "cooperation and sum of efforts" with the .cat domain, even though the proposal has already received the criticisms of the Generalitat de Catalunya and of several personalities from the cultural and technological world of Catalonia.

Another generic top-level domain for Barcelona is .barcelona.

See also
.cat

References

Proposed top-level domains
Mass media in Barcelona
Internet in Spain
2015 establishments in Catalonia